Hypotrachyna revoluta is a species of fungus belonging to the family Parmeliaceae.

It has cosmopolitan distribution.

References

revoluta
Lichen species
Taxa named by Heinrich Gustav Flörke
Lichens described in 1815